John J. O'Shea is an American physician and immunologist.

Early life and education
O'Shea was born in Clason Point in the Bronx, New York. He graduated Phi Beta Kappa with a Bachelor of Science degree from St. Lawrence University and a Doctor of Medicine degree from the University of Cincinnati.  He then served as an intern and resident in internal medicine at the State University of New York Upstate Medical University in Syracuse, New York.

Research and Career
He came to the National Institutes of Health (NIH) in 1981 for subspecialty training in allergy and immunology in the National Institute of Allergy and Infectious Diseases. He did additional postdoctoral work in the Cell Biology and Metabolism Branch in the National Institute of Child Health and Human Development. O'Shea is board certified in internal medicine and allergy and immunology.

He started his own group in the National Cancer Institute in 1989, and then moved to the National Institute of Arthritis and Musculoskeletal and Skin Diseases (NIAMS) in 1994 as chief of the Lymphocyte Cell Biology Section of the Arthritis and Rheumatism Branch. He was appointed chief of the Molecular Immunology and Inflammation Branch in 2002, and became scientific director and director of the NIAMS Intramural Research Program in 2005. O'Shea also served as acting director of the NIH Center for Regenerative Medicine from 2009 to 2011. O'Shea is also an adjunct professor in the Department of Pathology at the University of Pennsylvania.

Laboratory affiliations

 Molecular Immunology and Inflammation Branch (MIIB)

The MIIB conducts basic and clinical investigations on the molecular mechanisms underlying immune and inflammatory responses in rheumatic and autoimmune diseases. A major focus of the Branch is the study of receptor-mediated signal transduction and how these events link to the regulation of genes involved in inflammatory responses. The Branch comprises one section:

Lymphocyte Cell Biology Section

Conducts research into the molecular basis of cytokine action to define the mechanisms by which these mediators regulate processes such as development, differentiation, memory, tolerance and homeostasis in immune cells. The section also studies patients with primary immunodeficiency and autoinflammatory syndromes.

Lymphocyte Signal Transduction

His area of scientific interest is cytokine signal transduction, dissecting the role of Jaks and Stats family transcription in immunoregulation. O'Shea and his colleagues cloned the tyrosine kinase, Jak3, and demonstrated its role in pathogenesis of severe combined immunodeficiency. O'Shea and colleagues at the NIH identified the role of Stat3 in regulating T cell cytokine production in Job's syndrome. More recently, O'Shea's laboratory has employed deep sequencing to understand the epigenetic regulation of T cell differentiation and the role of STATs in these processes.

Janus kinase (JAK) inhibitors
O'Shea was awarded two US Patents related to Janus Family Kinases and identification of immune modulators (7,070,972, and 7,488,808). O'Shea collaborated with colleagues at Pfizer including Paul Changelian to develop the Janus kinase inhibitor tofacitinib.  Currently there are nine Janus kinase inhibitors approved by various agencies.

Awards and memberships

O'Shea has received many awards, including: the U.S. Public Health Service Physician Researcher of the Year Award; the Paul Bunn Award in Infectious Disease; the Lee C. Howley Prize in Arthritis Research; and the Irish Society for Immunology Public Lecture Award. He has been the recipient of the National Institutes of Health Director's Award three times (1998, 2008, 2010). He was elected to the Association of American Physicians and the American Society for Clinical Investigation. He is also an ISI Web of Knowledge “Highly Cited Researcher”. He received the NIAMS Mentoring Award in 2003, and the NIH “Make a Difference” Office of Equal Opportunity Award in 2006. He was selected for the NYU Honors Lectureship, the Danny Thomas Lecture and more.

O'Shea has served on the editorial boards of multiple journals, including Immunity, Journal of Experimental Medicine, Journal of Biological Chemistry, Journal of Immunology, and Blood. He has been an invited lecturer at numerous universities and international meetings in the U.S., Canada, Europe and Asia.

O'Shea is one of the co-founders of the NIH Oxford-Cambridge Scholars Program in Biomedical Science, is a member of NIH-UPENN Immunology Program, and has served as a Howard Hughes Medical Institute Scholars Advisor.

Publications

O'Shea has authored more than 330 articles.

References

National Institutes of Health people
American immunologists
Living people
State University of New York Upstate Medical University alumni
Year of birth missing (living people)